Greta Hopkinson (born Greta Karin Louise Stromeyer, 4 October 1901 – September 1993) was a British wood sculptor.

Biography
Hopkinson was born in West Didsbury, Manchester. Her father Charles Edmund Stromeyer was a British civil engineer (expert on ship boiler design and designer of a shell propelled grappling hook used during World War I to remove barbed wire fences) and her mother, Alma Karin Lindstein, an acclaimed Swedish singer.

She was educated at Ladybarn House School, Withington Girls' School, Manchester and Sandecotes School in Parkston, Dorset. She then studied Modern and Mediaeval Languages at Newnham College, Cambridge (1921–24), becoming one of its youngest female graduates.  For a while she was employed as Secretary to the Editor of the New Statesman, Clifford Dyce Sharp (1928–29).

On 8 June 1929 she married Dr. Harry Cunliffe Hopkinson (d.1965) and travelled Europe with him. After the War they lived on the Isle of Wight before retiring to Pine Cottage, a house on the edge of the New Forest and previously the home of Gordon Jacob, the well-known British composer. Hopkinson died in Brockenhurst, Hampshire,

References
In his review of Roger Deakin’s book, Wildwood: A Journey into the Trees, in The Independent, Hugh Thomson compared her work to that of modern sculptors Richard Long and Andy Goldsworthy. (6 July 2007).

Exhibitions
Her work appeared at the Southampton Art Gallery exhibition "Dead Wood Alive" in 1977.
In the early 1990s Hopkinson's work was also exhibited in the New Forest, alongside that of Royal Academy painter Barry Peckham, whose subjects include the Solent and Hampshire.

References

English sculptors
English engravers
English wood engravers
People from Didsbury
People from Brockenhurst
1901 births
1993 deaths
20th-century engravers